Saint Nicholas Monastery may refer to:

Saint Nicholas Monastery (Mukacheve), Ukraine
Saint Nicholas Monastery, Jaffa, Israel
Peshtera Monastery of Saint Nicholas of Myra, Bulgaria

See also
Saint Nicholas (disambiguation)
St. Nicholas Church (disambiguation)